Galaxy Tab S may refer to:
 Samsung Galaxy Tab S 8.4
 Samsung Galaxy Tab S 10.5